Anderson Field  is a town-owned public-use airport located three nautical miles (6 km) east of the central business district of Brewster, a town in Okanogan County, Washington, United States.

Facilities and aircraft 
It has one asphalt paved runway designated 7/25 which measures 4,000 by 60 feet (1,219 x 18 m). For the 12-month period ending December 30, 2012, the airport had 25,000 general aviation aircraft operations, an average of over 50 per day.

References

External links 
 Anderson Field (S97) at Washington State DOT

Airports in Washington (state)
Transportation buildings and structures in Okanogan County, Washington